David Morris Lee (born January 20, 1931) is an American physicist who shared the 1996 Nobel Prize in Physics with Robert C. Richardson and Douglas Osheroff "for their discovery of superfluidity in helium-3." Lee is professor emeritus of physics at Cornell University and distinguished professor of physics at Texas A&M University.

Personal life
Lee was born and raised in Rye, New York. His parents, Annette (Franks), a teacher, and Marvin Lee, an electrical engineer, were children of Jewish immigrants from England and Lithuania. He graduated from Harvard University in 1952 and then joined the U.S. Army for 22 months. After being discharged from the army, he obtained a master's degree from the University of Connecticut.  In 1955 Lee entered the Ph.D. program at Yale University where he worked under Henry A. Fairbank in the low-temperature physics group, doing experimental research on liquid 3He.

After graduating from Yale in 1959, Lee took a job at Cornell University, where he was responsible for setting up the new Laboratory of Atomic and Solid State Physics.  Shortly after arriving at Cornell he met his future wife, Dana, then a PhD student in another department; the couple went on to have two sons.

Lee moved his laboratory from Cornell to Texas A&M University on November 16, 2009.

In the summer of 2016, Lee lost his wife, Dana, due to un-diagnosed health issues.

Work
The work that led to Lee's Nobel Prize was performed in the early 1970s.  Lee, together with Robert C. Richardson and graduate student, Doug Osheroff used a Pomeranchuk cell to investigate the behaviour of 3He at temperatures within a few thousandths of a degree of absolute zero.  They discovered unexpected effects in their measurements, which they eventually explained as phase transitions to a superfluid phase of 3He.  Lee, Richardson and Osheroff were jointly awarded the Nobel Prize in Physics in 1996 for this discovery.

Lee's research also covered a number of other topics in low-temperature physics, particularly relating to liquid, solid and superfluid helium (4He, 3He and mixtures of the two).  Particular discoveries include the antiferromagnetic ordering in solid helium-3, nuclear spin waves in spin polarized atomic hydrogen gas with Jack H. Freed, and the tri-critical point on the phase separation curve of liquid 4He-3He, in collaboration with his Cornell colleague John Reppy. His  former research group at Cornell currently studies impurity-helium solids.

As well as the Nobel Prize, other prizes won by Lee include the 1976 Sir Francis Simon Memorial Prize of the British Institute of Physics and the 1981 Oliver Buckley Prize of the American Physical Society along with Doug Osheroff and Robert Richardson for their superfluid 3He work. In 1997, Lee received the Golden Plate Award of the American Academy of Achievement.

Lee is a member of the National Academy of Sciences and the American Academy of Arts and Sciences.

Lee is currently teaching physics at Texas A&M University and continuing his (formerly Cornell-based) research program there as well.

Lee is one of the 20 American recipients of the Nobel Prize in Physics to sign a letter addressed to President George W. Bush in May of 2008, urging him to "reverse the damage done to basic science research in the Fiscal Year 2008 Omnibus Appropriations Bill" by requesting additional emergency funding for the Department of Energy’s Office of Science, the National Science Foundation, and the National Institute of Standards and Technology.

See also
List of Jewish Nobel laureates
Timeline of low-temperature technology

References

External links
Faculty page at Cornell
  including the Nobel Lecture, December 7, 1996 The Extraordinary Phases of Liquid 3He

1931 births
Living people
Nobel laureates in Physics
American Nobel laureates
American people of British-Jewish descent
American people of Lithuanian-Jewish descent
Jewish American scientists
Jewish physicists
Harvard University alumni
University of Connecticut alumni
Yale Graduate School of Arts and Sciences alumni
Cornell University faculty
Cornell Laboratory of Atomic and Solid State Physics
21st-century American physicists
University of Florida faculty
People from Rye, New York
Texas A&M University faculty
Members of the United States National Academy of Sciences
Foreign Members of the Russian Academy of Sciences
Oliver E. Buckley Condensed Matter Prize winners
Scientists from New York (state)
Fellows of the American Physical Society